Lee David Ingleby (born 28 January 1976) is an English film, television and stage actor.

He is best known for his roles as Detective Sergeant/Detective Inspector John Bacchus in the BBC drama Inspector George Gently, as Stan Shunpike in Harry Potter and the Prisoner of Azkaban and the role of Paul Hughes, the father of an autistic child, Joe, in a BBC drama, The A Word.

Early life
Ingleby was born in Burnley, Lancashire, son of Gordon Ingleby and Susan M Hoggarth, and lived in nearby Brierfield during the early part of his life, attending Edge End High School, as did fellow actor John Simm. Both were taught by the same drama teacher Brian Wellock  who encouraged them into the professional theatre. He then studied at Accrington and Rossendale College before progressing to the drama school LAMDA in London.

Career

Ingleby's first major role was as the young lead in the 2000 BBC miniseries Nature Boy alongside Paul McGann. He played Smike in a 2001 television film version of The Life and Adventures of Nicholas Nickleby. Also in 2001, he starred in and wrote the screenplay for the short film Cracks in the Ceiling, which he appeared in with his father, Gordon Ingleby. In the 2002 theatrical release Borstal Boy, based very loosely on the life of Irish poet-activist Brendan Behan, Ingleby played a bully in an English boarding school for juvenile offenders.

Ingleby has also made one-off appearances in television programmes such as Hustle, Clocking Off, No Angels, Fat Friends, Jonathan Creek, Spaced, Dalziel and Pascoe, Cadfael (Pilgrim of Hate) and The Bill. He has had supporting roles in films such as Gustave in Ever After alongside Drew Barrymore and as Hollom in the 2003 Peter Weir film Master and Commander: The Far Side of the World.

In 2004, Ingleby had a small role in the Orlando Bloom vehicle Haven, which premiered at the Toronto Film Festival but was not commercially released until 2006 following heavy re-editing. He also guest-starred in the Doctor Who audio adventure Terror Firma.

In 2006 Ingleby appeared in Jimmy McGovern BBC TV series The Street, where he played abusive husband Sean O'Neill alongside Christine Bottomley. Another project was the 2006 television adaptation of The Wind in the Willows, in which he played Mole. It also starred Bob Hoskins as Badger, Matt Lucas as Toad and Mark Gatiss as Ratty. He also appeared in a modernised BBC adaptation of Rapunzel for the Fairy Tales series.

In 2007 Ingleby was cast as DS John Bacchus (later promoted to inspector in series 7, 2015) in the BBC police drama Inspector George Gently.

Ingleby headed the cast of the 2008 three-part television crime drama A Place of Execution as DI George Bennett as he was in the 1960s determined to close the case of a missing girl. When not working in films and television, Ingleby remains active on the stage, where his credits include Puck in Midsummer Night's Dream, Alexander in Nicholas Wright's Cressida and Katurian in Martin McDonagh's The Pillowman. He performed in the play Our Class by Tadeusz Slobodzianek at the Cottesloe Theatre from September 2009 to January 2010 as Zygmunt.

In 2011, Ingleby appeared in the television series Being Human as Edgar Wyndham, a menacing vampire elder, and also in Luther as serial killer Cameron Pell.

In 2013, Ingleby took on the voice role of Phillip De Nicholay, the Sheriff of Nottingham, in a new audio production of the Robin Hood legend, produced by Spiteful Puppet. He returned to the role in the follow up "HOOD – The Scribe of Sherwood". In the same year, two more feature length audio stories (Warriors' Harvest and King's Command) have been produced by Spiteful Puppet with Ingleby once again playing the role of "De Nicholay".

In 2014, he played Leslie in the BBC drama series Quirke.

In 2015 Ingleby first played Bob in the UK version of the new computer-generated series Bob The Builder - a role that continued until 2018. That same year he provided spoken word narration on the progressive rock album Please Come Home which the British musician John Mitchell released under the project name Lonely Robot.

In 2016 Ingleby first appeared in the role of Paul Hughes, father of autistic child Joe, in BBC drama series The A Word, which ran until 2020.

Filmography

Film

Television

Radio
Cry Hungary (as Peter Kovacs), BBC Radio 4, 2006
Radio Head, Up and Down the Dial of British Radio by John Osborne, Book of the Week, BBC Radio 4, 2009
A Kind of Loving (as Vic Brown), BBC Radio 4, 2010
Boots on the Ground (as Marks), BBC Radio 4, 2013
Hood: Noble Secrets (as Phillip De Nicholay – Sheriff of Nottingham), Spiteful Puppet, 2013
 House of Ghosts: A Case for Inspector Morse' (as DS Lewis) BBC Radio 4, 2017 Morse: In The Shallows' (as DS Lewis) BBC Radio 4,  BBC Radio Programmes, 2018

References

External links
 
 
 

Living people
1976 births
Alumni of the London Academy of Music and Dramatic Art
English male film actors
English male stage actors
English male television actors
People from Burnley
British male Shakespearean actors
Male actors from Lancashire
20th-century English male actors
21st-century English male actors